Mutiny is a 1925 British silent adventure film directed by F. Martin Thornton and starring Nigel Barrie, Doris Lytton and Walter Tennyson.

Cast
 Nigel Barrie as John England  
 Doris Lytton as Diana  
 Walter Tennyson 
 Clifton Boyne 
 Donald Searle

References

Bibliography
 Goble, Alan. The Complete Index to Literary Sources in Film. Walter de Gruyter, 1999.

External links

1925 films
1925 adventure films
British silent feature films
British adventure films
1920s English-language films
Films directed by Floyd Martin Thornton
Films based on British novels
Seafaring films
British black-and-white films
Silent adventure films
1920s British films